Suraya Sadraddin qizi Qajar (May 1, 1910 – July 27, 1992) was a Soviet and Azerbaijani singer (mezzo-soprano). She was awarded the People's Artist of the Azerbaijan SSR (October 30, 1954), and People's Artist of the Armenian SSR.

Life 
Qajar was born on May 1, 1910, in Shusha, Russian Empire. In 1927 she graduated from the Baku Pedagogical College. From 1927 to 1939 she was a soloist of the Azerbaijan State Academic Opera and Ballet Theater. Since 1940 she has been a soloist of the Azerbaijan State Academic Philharmonic Hall, and since 1968 she has been a vocal teacher-consultant. From 1946 to 1957 she was a soloist of the Armenian State Academic Philharmonic Hall.

The main focus in the work of Qajar was occupied by Azerbaijani folk songs, mugams, as well as songs of the peoples of the USSR and Soviet composers. She has toured both in the cities of the Soviet Union and in Iran. She was awarded two Orders of the Badge of Honor and medals. She died in 1992 in Baku.

Roles 
 Leyli – Leyli and Majnun (Uzeyir Hajibeyov)
 Asli – Asli and Kerem (Uzeyir Hajibeyov)
 Gulnaz – If Not That One, Then This One (Uzeyir Hajibeyov)
 Shahsenem – Ashig Garib (Zulfugar Hajibeyov)

Family 
His father, Sadraddin Mirza Gajar, was an officer belonging to the Bahmani family. The family was founded by Bahman Mirza Qajar, a former governor of Iranian Azerbaijan and a member of the Qajar dynasty. Sadraddin Mirza Qajar was executed by Bolsheviks after Red Army invasion of Azerbaijan.

References

Sources 
 

People's Artists of the Azerbaijan SSR
People's Artists of Armenia
Qajar princesses
20th-century Azerbaijani women opera singers
Operatic mezzo-sopranos
Bahmani family
1910 births
1992 deaths
People from Elizavetpol Governorate
Azerbaijani Muslims
Musicians from Shusha
Azerbaijani people of Iranian descent
Soviet singers